The  Laurens Henry Cohn Sr. Memorial Plant Arboretum (or Cohn Arboretum), 16 acres (6.5 hectares), is an arboretum located at 12206 Foster Road, Baton Rouge, Louisiana. It is open to the public daily.

The Arboretum contains more than 120 species of native and adaptable trees and shrubs, including a Japanese Maple collection, an Orchid and Bromeliad House, a Tropical House, a Camellia Collection, an Evergreen and Conifer Collection, a Crape-myrtle Collection, and an Herb/Fragrance Garden.

See also
List of botanical gardens in the United States

Arboreta in Louisiana
Botanical gardens in Louisiana
Protected areas of East Baton Rouge Parish, Louisiana
Tourist attractions in Baton Rouge, Louisiana